A statutory referendum on the approval of the Basque Statute of Autonomy was held in the Basque Country on Sunday, 5 November 1933. Voters were asked whether they ratified a proposed draft Statute of Autonomy of the Basque Country. Article 12 of the Spanish Constitution of 1931 allowed for Spanish provinces to be organized into "autonomous regions", provided that a regional Statute was proposed by a majority of the provinces' municipalities comprising at least two-thirds of the provincial population and that two-thirds majority of all those eligible to vote accepted the draft Statute.

The referendum resulted in 96.7% of valid votes in support of the draft Statute on a turnout of 93.7%, representing 84.0% of the electorate. The draft Statute was subsequently submitted to the consideration of the Spanish Cortes, which initially rejected it on 28 January 1934 with a 125–136 result as a consequence of popular support not reaching the required two-thirds majority in the province of Álava, where it stood at 46.4% due to boycott from carlists. After the Popular Front's victory in the 1936 general election, the Statute was finally approved on 1 October 1936, though its application would be severely limited as a result of the outbreak of the Spanish Civil War.

Results

See also
1931 Catalan Statute of Autonomy referendum
1936 Galician Statute of Autonomy referendum

References

1933 referendums
1933 in Spain
Basque politics
November 1933 events
Referendums in the Basque Country (autonomous community)
Basque Country